"Outlook for Thursday" is a single by New Zealand band DD Smash. It was released in 1983 unrelated to any album (though a live version appears on the 1983 live album Live: Deep in the Heart of Taxes. The single charted at No. 3 in New Zealand. and was voted in 2001 by members of APRA as the 31st best New Zealand song of the 20th century.

Alternate version
A live version appears on the 1983 live album Live: Deep in the Heart of Taxes.

Music video
The music video was directed by Andrew Shaw and filmed in Auckland featuring Dobbyn as a frazzled weather announcer. The video won Best Music Video at the 1983 New Zealand Music Awards.

References

External links
 Outlook for Thursday video (NZ On Screen)

1983 singles
APRA Award winners
Number-one singles in New Zealand
Number-one singles in Australia
DD Smash songs
Songs written by Dave Dobbyn
Songs about weather